Lopburi is a province in the central region of Thailand. The province is divided into 11 administrative districts, and Mueang Lopburi district is the capital. With over 750,000 people, the province is Thailand's 36th largest area and 32nd most populous. There are eight neighboring provinces, Phetchabun, Chaiyaphum, Nakhon Ratchasima, Saraburi, Phra Nakhon Si Ayutthaya, Ang Thong, Sing Buri, and Nakhon Sawan.

Lopburi is a significant province historically, where many historical structures, artifacts, and prehistoric settlements have been discovered. In the past, Lopburi was called by the name Lavo, after the Lavapuri, (present day Lahore) city named after the second son of Ram.The kingdom had been ruled by an absolute monarch.

Toponymy
It was originally known as Lavo or Lavapura, meaning "city of Lava" in reference to the ancient South Asian city of Lavapuri (present-day Lahore, Pakistan).

History

Known as Lavo during much of its history, Lopburi probably dates to prehistoric times. The name Lavo originated from the capital city of Lavo kingdom, an ancient Mon kingdom of Dvaravati period (6th–11th century CE). The conquering Khmer would build many impressive temples in the city during its rule. Lopburi may even have liberated itself for a time, as it sent independent embassies to China in 1115 and 1155. In 1289 it sent another embassy to China, but soon became part of the Thai kingdom of Sukhothai and later Ayutthaya.

During the Ayutthaya period, King Ramathibodi I sent Phra Ramesuan (later King Ramesuan) as the Uparaja to reign in Lopburi. In 1666 King Narai the Great ordered a new palace built on the east bank of the Lopburi River and made Lopburi the second capital of the country, as Ayutthaya was threatened by the Dutch. After King Narai died, the city was almost abandoned and fell into ruin.

In 1856 King Mongkut of the Chakri dynasty ordered King Narai's palace to be renovated. The city finally regained its importance in 1937, when  Field Marshal Plaek Phibunsongkhram chose Lopburi to be the largest military base in Thailand and once was decide to be new capital city of Thailand after the end of World War II.

Geography
Lopburi is on the east side of the Chao Phraya River valley, between the Lopburi River and Pa Sak Rivers. Thirty percent of the area of the province, including most of Tha Wung district, the southwestern parts of Mueang Lopburi and Ban Mi districts are a very low alluvial plain. The other 70 percent is mixed plains and hills, with the Phetchabun Mountains forming the eastern boundary of the province towards the Khorat Plateau.

Wildlife sanctuary
There is one wildlife sanctuary in region 1 (Saraburi branch) of Thailand's protected areas.
 Sap Langka Wildlife Sanctuary,

Climate
Lopburi province has a tropical savanna climate (Köppen climate classification category Aw). Winters are dry and warm. Temperatures rise until May. Monsoon season runs from May through October, with heavy rain and somewhat cooler temperatures during the day, although nights remain warm. Climatic statistics: Its maximum temperature is 41.4 °C (106.5 °F) in April and the lowest temperature is 10.2 °C (50.4 °F) in December. The highest average temperature is 36.8 °C (98.2 °F) and the minimum average temperature is 20.6 °C (69.1 °F). Annual average rainfall is 1,125 millimeters with mean rainy days is 17.6 in September. Maximum daily rainfall is 203.4 millimeters in October.

Symbols
The provincial seal shows Vishnu in front of the Khmer temple Phra Prang Sam Yod.

The escutcheon of Lopburi shows Phra Narai and in the background Phra Prang Sam Yod, the "Sanctuary with the Three Towers". It refers to King Narai who in 1664 fortified the city to be used as an alternative capital when Ayutthaya was threatened by a Dutch naval blockade.

The provincial tree as well as the provincial flower is the bullet wood.

The slogan of the province is National treasures of King Narai's palace and Phra Kan Shrine, famous Prang Sam Yot, city of Din So Phong Marl, well-known Pa Sak Cholasit Dam and golden land of King Narai the Great.

Administrative divisions

Provincial government

The province is subdivided into 11 districts (amphoe). The districts are further subdivided into 122 sub-districts (tambon) and 1,126 villages (muban).

Local government
As of 26 November 2019 there are: one Lopburi Provincial Administrative Organization and 23 municipal (thesaban) areas in the province. Lopburi, Khao Sam Yot and Ban Mi have town (thesaban mueang) status. Further 20 subdistrict municipalities (thesaban tambon). The non-municipal areas are administered by 102 Subdistrict Administrative Organizations - SAO (ongkan borihan suan tambon).

Transportation

Rail
Lopburi railway station is a station of the State Railway of Thailand's Northern Line, the end of Bangkok's suburban service.

Roads
The main road through Lobpuri is Route 1 (Phahonyothin Road), which starts in Bangkok, and continues through Lopburi, Chai Nat, Nakhon Sawan, Kamphaeng Phet, Tak, Lampang, Chiang Rai, and the border with Burma at Mae Sai. Route 311 leads west to Sing Buri, and Route 3196 leads south-west to Ang Thong.

Air
It has no commercial flights.

Health 
Lopburi's main hospital is King Narai Hospital, operated by the Ministry of Public Health.

Education
Thepsatri Rajabhat University
Kasetsart University, Lopburi Campus
Ramkhamhaeng University, Lopburi Campus
 Pibul Wittayalai School

Events and festivals
King Narai Reign Fair (งานแผ่นดินสมเด็จพระนารายณ์): Event held annually, it is considered the greatest fair of the province. The objective is to honour King Narai the Great, who used to live here. The highlight is that all Lopburi people are dressed in traditional Thai clothes throughout the province and there is a sound and light performance at the King Narai's Palace in the evening. This fair is promoted by Tourism Authority of Thailand (TAT).
Monkey Buffet Festival (เทศกาลโต๊ะจีนลิง): Annually buffet held during November for herd of macaques that live at ancient Khmer temple, Phra Prang Sam Yot and nearby Phra Kan Shrine in the centre of province, which they are like a symbol of the province. It was first organized in the year 1989.
Climbing Up Khao Wong Phra Chan Festival (ประเพณีขึ้นเขาวงพระจันทร์): Pilgrimage inscription by climbing up 3,790 steps of Khao Wong Phrachan (crescent moon hill), the province's highest hill that located in Khok Samrong district for pay homage to replica of the Lord Buddha's footprint and Buddha statues that enshrined on the top of the hill. This festival is usually held on the Chinese New Year period and has been very popular, especially from Thai people of Chinese descent.

Human achievement index 2017

Since 2003, United Nations Development Programme (UNDP) in Thailand has tracked progress on human development at sub-national level using the Human achievement index (HAI), a composite index covering all the eight key areas of human development. National Economic and Social Development Board (NESDB) has taken over this task since 2017.

References

External links

Website of province (Thai)
Lopburi provincial map, coat of arms and postal stamp 

 
Provinces of Thailand